David Peter Gorman (born April 8, 1955) is a Canadian former professional ice hockey player who played 260 games in the World Hockey Association and three games in the National Hockey League between 1975 and 1980.

Career 
As a youth, Gorman played in the 1967 Quebec International Pee-Wee Hockey Tournament with the Toronto Swiss Chalet minor ice hockey team. He later played for the Birmingham Bulls, Atlanta Flames, and Phoenix Roadrunners.

Career statistics

Regular season and playoffs

References

External links
 

1955 births
Living people
Atlanta Flames players
Birmingham Bulls (CHL) players
Birmingham Bulls players
Canadian expatriate ice hockey players in the United States
Canadian ice hockey right wingers
GCK Lions players
Hampton Gulls (AHL) players
Ice hockey people from Ontario
Montreal Canadiens draft picks
Nova Scotia Voyageurs players
Phoenix Roadrunners (WHA) players
Phoenix Roadrunners draft picks
Rochester Americans players
SC Herisau players
Sportspeople from Oshawa
St. Catharines Black Hawks players
Tulsa Oilers (1964–1984) players